<noinclude>
Chiapas is a state in Southwest Mexico. According to the 2020 Mexican Census, it has the eighth largest population of all states with  inhabitants and the 10th largest by land area spanning . Chiapas is officially divided into 124 municipalities, although the establishment of municipal authorities in Belisario Domínguez was suspended in 2015 pending the resolution of a territorial dispute between Chiapas and the neighbouring state of Oaxaca. In 2021, the Mexican Supreme Court resolved this dispute in Oaxaca's favour, and annulled the 2011 decree that had created Belisario Domínguez.

Municipalities in Chiapas are administratively autonomous of the state according to the 115th article of the 1917 Constitution of Mexico. Every three years, citizens elect a municipal president (Spanish: presidente municipal) by a plurality voting system who heads a concurrently elected municipal council (ayuntamiento) responsible for providing all the public services for their constituents. The municipal council consists of a variable number of trustees and councillors (regidores y síndicos). Municipalities are responsible for public services (such as water and sewerage), street lighting, public safety, traffic, and the maintenance of public parks, gardens and cemeteries. They may also assist the state and federal governments in education, emergency fire and medical services, environmental protection and maintenance of monuments and historical landmarks. Since 1984, they have had the power to collect property taxes and user fees, although more funds are obtained from the state and federal governments than from their own income.

The largest municipality by population is the state capital Tuxtla Gutiérrez, with 604,147 residents while the smallest is Sunuapa with 2,308 residents. The largest municipality by land area is Ocosingo which spans , and the smallest is Santiago el Pinar which spans . The newest municipality is Honduras de la Sierra, incorporated on July 15, 2018.

Municipalities

Notes

References

 
Chiapas